Ernad Sabotic (born 23 October 1979) is a retired Luxembourgian football midfielder.

References

1979 births
Living people
Luxembourgian footballers
Jeunesse Esch players
FC Swift Hesperange players
UN Käerjéng 97 players
Union Luxembourg players
CS Grevenmacher players
Association football midfielders
Luxembourg international footballers